Silent Strength is a 1919 American silent drama film directed by Paul Scardon and written by Garfield Thompson and Lawrence McCloskey.  The film stars Harry T. Morey, Robert Gaillard, and Betty Blythe.

Cast list

References

1919 films
American silent feature films
American black-and-white films
1919 drama films
Films directed by Paul Scardon
1910s American films